A glycosyl group is a univalent free radical or substituent structure obtained by removing the hemiacetal hydroxyl group from the cyclic form of a monosaccharide and, by extension, of a lower oligosaccharide.
Glycosyl also reacts with inorganic acids, such as phosphoric acid, forming an ester such as glucose 1-phosphate.

Examples 
In cellulose, glycosyl groups link together 1,4-β-D-glucosyl units to form chains of (1,4-β-D-glucosyl)n.
Other examples include ribityl in 6,7-Dimethyl-8-ribityllumazine, and glycosylamines.

Alternative substituent groups

Instead of the hemiacetal hydroxyl group, a hydrogen atom can be removed to form a substituent, for example the hydrogen from the C3 hydroxyl of a glucose molecule. Then the substituent is called D-glucopyranos-3-O-yl as it appears in the name of the drug Mifamurtide.

Recent detection of the Au3+ in living organism was possible through the use of C-glycosyl pyrene, where it's permeability through cell membrane and fluorescence properties were used to detect Au3+.

See also
Acyl group

References

Substituents
Biomolecules
Monosaccharides
Oligosaccharides